Papyrus 65 (in the Gregory-Aland numbering), designated by 𝔓65, is a copy of the New Testament in Greek. It is a papyrus manuscript of the First Epistle to the Thessalonians. The surviving texts of the epistle are the verses 1:3-2:1 and 2:6-13. The manuscript has been assigned on palaeographic grounds to the 3rd century.

 Text 
The Greek text of this codex is a representative of the Alexandrian text-type. Aland placed it in Category I, but text of the manuscript is too brief for certainty. According to Comfort 𝔓49 and 𝔓65 came from the same manuscript.

 Location 
It is currently housed at the Papyrological Institute of Florence in National Archaeological Museum (Florence) (PSI 1373).

See also 

 List of New Testament papyri

References

Further reading 

 Vittorio Bartoletti, Papiri greci e latini della Società Italiana, vol. XIV, (1957), pp. 5–7. 
 Naldini, Documenti, no. 17.

Images 
 Papyrus 65

New Testament papyri
3rd-century biblical manuscripts
Early Greek manuscripts of the New Testament
National Archaeological Museum, Florence
First Epistle to the Thessalonians papyri